Espey is an unincorporated community in Atascosa County, in the U.S. state of Texas. According to the Handbook of Texas, the community had a population of 55 in 2000. It is located within the San Antonio metropolitan area.

History
Espey received its name from a family who settled there in the early 20th century. Its land was used for farming and ranching, and an orchard was planted in 1926. They established a family business called the Espey Silica Sand Company in 1918 which is still in operation today. The county had a plentiful supply of silica sand that businesses in the area used for industrial purposes such as glass making. The San Antonio, Uvalde and Gulf Railroad (now the Missouri Pacific Railroad) shipped loads of it into the community. Espey had a cemetery, several homes, and a factory in the area on 1936 county maps, although the community was not listed by name. A church called St. Joseph's Catholic Church served families in the area for decades before it closed in 1981. It was then listed on county maps, as well as a nearby sandpit, by the 1960s. It did not have any population statistics available until it was listed at 55 in 2000.

Geography

Education
Espey is served by the Pleasanton Independent School District.

References

Unincorporated communities in Atascosa County, Texas
Unincorporated communities in Texas